Mrs P.I. is a Singaporean Chinese drama which was telecasted on Singapore's free-to-air channel, MediaCorp Channel 8. It stars Michelle Chong , Cynthia Koh , Apple Hong , Zhang Zhenhuan , Zheng Geping , Yao Wenlong & Cavin Soh as the casts of the series. It made its debut on 8 November 2010 and ended on 3 December 2010. This drama serial consists of 20 episodes, and was screened on every weekday night at 9:00 pm. The encore is being made from 2 November 2011 to 29 November 2011 at every weekday at 5:30pm.

The series title (pronounced "zha boh lang") is the Teochew word and Singlish colloquialism for "woman".

Cast

Main Cast

Other Cast

Star Awards 2011

Trivia
Although its daily average viewership is 830,000, this drama was only nominated for one award in the Star Awards 2011.
This drama's original name was Goddesses of Justice (simplified Chinese: 正义女神).
Zhang Jiaqiang's lover's name, Pan Lingling, comes from the TV artiste.
The series is used as television broadcast in other drama series. For instance, in episode 10 of 118, Chen Tianwen commented how the lines were so similar, he can write these lines for other drama series.

See also
List of programmes broadcast by Mediacorp Channel 8

Singapore Chinese dramas
2010 Singaporean television series debuts
2010 Singaporean television series endings
Channel 8 (Singapore) original programming